The first season of Ang Probinsyano, a Philippine action drama television series, premiered on September 28, 2015, on ABS-CBN's Primetime Bida evening block and worldwide on The Filipino Channel and concluded on September 30, 2016. The series stars Coco Martin in a dual role as SPO2 Ricardo Dalisay and Police S/Insp. Dominador de Leon, together with an ensemble cast.

The first season of Ang Probinsyano chronicles the lives of Ricardo "Cardo" Dalisay and Dominador "Ador" de Leon, identical twins who were separated during childhood. Their lives intertwine once again when Ador was killed during a mission to stop a human trafficking syndicate. Cardo must now assume the identity of his brother and finish the mission, while also reconnecting with his biological family. After his cover is blown, Cardo was reassigned to CIDG where he handles cases that put him into conflict with the Tuazon family, a rich philanthropist family to the public, who are actually in the illicit business of drug and human trafficking.

Plot  
The story revolves around the journey of twins Dominador "Ador" de Leon and Ricardo "Cardo" Dalisay (both played by Coco Martin) were separated from each other because of financial reasons, even as they followed the path of being police officers.

Ador is raised by his grandmother, Flora (Susan Roces). He enters the Philippine National Police Academy alongside Joaquin Tuazon (Arjo Atayde). During his stint in the Police Academy, he meets Carmen (Bela Padilla), sister of his classmate Billy (John Medina). After graduating as the class valedictorian, Ador marries Carmen upon discovering her pregnancy. Carmen gives birth to Dominador "Junior" de Leon, Jr. (Lei Andrei Navarro).

Ador continues to display his intelligence and skill as a policeman and is eventually promoted to Senior Inspector. He becomes a prominent and respected CIDG police official in Manila with a loving family as his support.

Cardo loves the solitude of mountains in the rural town of Botolan, Zambales. He grows up with his childhood best friend, Glen (Maja Salvador), who secretly has a crush on him. Both of them enter the police force, with Cardo joining the SAF.

Their lives take a sudden turn when Ador is betrayed and murdered by Joaquin after pursuing the latter's child-trafficking syndicate. Wanting to conceal the fact that Ador is killed in action, General Delfin Borja (Jaime Fábregas), Cardo and Ador's maternal great-uncle and CIDG Director, orders Cardo to assume Ador's identity and continue the mission his late brother left behind.

Cardo is forced to pretend to his brother's family and friends; and reunites with his grandmother, whom he resents for deserting him. Nevertheless, he promises to find the person behind his brother's death.

After his cover is blown, Cardo reveals himself and reunites with his family. Cardo is assigned back to CIDG and tackles various cases, some which ties directly to the Tuazon family's criminal acts.

Cast and characters 

Main cast
 Coco Martin as PS/Insp. Dominador "Ador" B. de Leon and SPO2 Ricardo "Cardo" Dalisay
 Maja Salvador as SPO1 Glenda "Glen" F. Corpuz
 Agot Isidro as Verna Syquia-Tuazon
 Jaime Fábregas as PC/Supt. Delfin S. Borja
 Arjo Atayde as PS/Insp. Joaquin S. Tuazon
 Bela Padilla as Carmen M. Guzman 
 Albert Martinez as Tomas "Papa Tom" G. Tuazon
 Susan Roces as Kapitana Flora "Lola Kap" S. Borja-de Leon
 Eddie Garcia as Don Emilio Syquia

Recurring cast
 Joey Marquez as Nanding Corpuz
 Malou de Guzman as Lolit Fajardo-Corpuz
 Dennis Padilla as Edgar Guzman
 Ana Roces as Leonora "Nora" Montano-Guzman
 Malou Crisologo as Yolanda "Yolly" Capuyao-Santos
 Beverly Salviejo as "Yaya" Cita Roque
 Pepe Herrera as Benjamin "Benny" Dimaapi 
 Marvin Yap as Elmo Santos
 Eda Nolan as Brenda F. Corpuz
 Belle Mariano as Rachel S. Tuazon
 Art Acuña as PS/Supt. Roy Carreon
 John Medina as PS/Insp. Avel "Billy" M. Guzman
 Lester Llansang as PS/Insp. Mark Vargas
 John Prats as SPO2 Jerome Girona, Jr.
 Michael Roy Jornales as PS/Insp.  Francisco "Chikoy" Rivera
 Marc Acueza as PS/Insp. Bernardino "Dino" Robles
 Rino Marco as PS/Insp. Gregorio "Greg" Sebastian 
 Marc Solis as SPO1 Rigor Soriano
 Yassi Pressman as Alyana R. Arevalo
 Ping Medina as Diego Sahagun
 Mhyco Aquino as Lorenz Gabriel
 Benj Manalo as Felipe "Pinggoy" Tanyag, Jr.
 Brace Arquiza as Ryan M. Guzman 
 Joel Torre as Teodoro "Teddy" Arevalo
 Shamaine Centenera-Buencamino as Virginia "Virgie" R. Arevalo 
 McCoy de Leon as Juan Pablo "JP" R. Arevalo
 Elisse Joson as Lorraine Pedrosa
 Lander Vera Perez as Alfred Borromeo
 Kiray Celis as Mitch
 Daisy Reyes as Belen Girona
 Lei Andrei Navarro as Dominador "Junior" G. de Leon, Jr.
 Simon Ezekiel Pineda as Honorio "Onyok" Amaba
 McNeal "Awra" Briguela as Macario "Makmak" Samonte, Jr.

Guest cast

Episodes

Notes

References

External links

2015 Philippine television seasons
2016 Philippine television seasons